Manuel Moschopoulos (Latinized as Manuel Moschopulus), was a Byzantine commentator and grammarian, who lived during the end of the 13th and the beginning of the 14th century and was an important figure in the Palaiologan Renaissance. Moschopoulos means "little calf," and is probably a nickname.

Life
Moschopoulos was a student of Maximos Planudes and possibly his successor as a head of a school in Constantinople, where he taught throughout his life. A mysterious and ill-documented excursion into politics led to his imprisonment for a while.

Works
His chief work is Erotemata grammaticalia, in the form of question and answer, based upon an anonymous epitome of grammar, and supplemented by a lexicon of Attic nouns. He was also the author of scholia on the first and second books of the Iliad, on Hesiod, Theocritus, Pindar and other classical and later authors; of riddles, letters, and a treatise on the magic squares. His grammatical treatises formed the foundation of the labors of such promoters of classical studies as Manuel Chrysoloras, Theodorus Gaza, Guarini, and Constantine Lascaris. As an editor, while making many false conjectures, he was responsible for clearing many long-standing errors in the traditional texts. His comments when original, are mainly lexicographical.

Other works include an anti-Latin theological pamphlet. A selection from his works under the title of Manuelis Moschopuli opuscula grammatica was published by F. N. Titze (Leipzig, 1822); see also Karl Krumbacher, Geschichte der byzantinischen Litteratur (1897) and M. Treu, Maximi monachi Planudis epistulae (1890), p. 208.

References

External links 
 Manuel Moschopoulos at Convergence
 
 
 Manuelis Moschopuli cretensis Opuscula grammatica, in quibus et de usitata graecis ex omni aevo diphthongorum pronuntiatione doctrina insignis : E codice nuper in Bohemia reperto nunc primum edidit graece / Praefationem cum diatribe literaria de Moschopulis et animadversiones suas adiecit Franciscus Nicolaus Titze digitised book in Latin and Ancient Greek at the Hathi Trust digital library (original at Harvard).

13th-century births
14th-century deaths
Byzantine grammarians
Magic squares
13th-century Byzantine people
14th-century Byzantine writers
14th-century Byzantine people